Neuwirth is a German surname, and may refer to:

 Aleš Neuwirth (born 1985), Czech football player
 Allan Charles Neuwirth (born 1956), American screenwriter, producer, author, designer and cartoonist
 Angelika Neuwirth (born 1943), German professor of Quranic studies
 Anton Neuwirth (1921–2004), Slovak medical doctor, political prisoner, Member of Parliament, and ambassador
 Bebe Neuwirth (born 1958), American theater, television, and film actress
 Bob Neuwirth (1939-2022), American singer, songwriter, record producer and visual artist
 Chantal Neuwirth (born 1948), French actress
 Erich Neuwirth (born 1948), Austrian professor emeritus of statistics und computer science at the University of Vienna
 Gösta Neuwirth (born 1937), Austrian musicologist, composer and academic teacher
 Jessica Neuwirth (born 1961), American lawyer and women's rights activist
 Lucien Neuwirth (1924–2013), French advocate for the oral contraceptive pill, who defended the Neuwirth Law
 Michal Neuvirth, Czech ice hockey player
 Olga Neuwirth (born 1968), Austrian composer
 Robert Neuwirth, American journalist and author
 Robert S. Neuwirth (1933–2013), American gynecologist
 Tassilo Neuwirth, Austrian ice hockey player
 Tom Neuwirth (born 1988), Austrian singer and drag queen, better known as Conchita Wurst
 Yehoshua Neuwirth (1927–2013), Israeli rabbi
 Yvonne Neuwirth (born 1992), Austrian tennis player

German-language surnames